The Epistula Mithridatis, also known as the Letter of Mithridates to King Arsaces, is a letter allegedly written by Mithridates VI of Pontus to the Parthian king Phraates III (70–57 BC). The letter was discovered "among a collection of Sallustian speeches and letters probably originally produced in the first or second centuries A.D". In the letter, Mithridates requests Parthian aid against the troops of Lucullus, and in a series of arguments, Mithridates asks the Parthians to join an alliance with Mithridates and Tigranes (king of Armenia), against the Romans. The letter, assigned to Sallust, is considered to be an important source on the Pontic–Parthian relations at the time.

According to Prof. Dr. Marek Jan Olbrycht, the letter suggests "a genuine document found by the Romans in the personal archives of Mithridates". According to Dr. Eric Adler (associate professor), the composition of the letter by Sallust, is largely the result of his own invention. Adler states that "A few scholars have asserted that the EM (Epistula Mithridatis) owes its origin to a document culled from the archives of Mithridates, which Sallust somehow acquired and translated or adapted into Latin. Some claim that Pompey discovered this epistle in a secret archive after the Third Mithridatic War, and then presumably brought to Rome. Others have supposed that the EM is an expression of authentic Pontic propaganda, and thus based on arguments that are not Sallust's own. (...) We can be reasonably certain, then, that the EM is the creation of Sallust and is the product of a Roman historian's attempt to reconstruct the likely arguments of an anti-Roman Eastern king".

Notes

References

Sources 
 
 

Kingdom of Pontus
Parthian Empire
Letters (message)
Latin texts
Parthian Dark Age
1st-century BC works